The Great Lakes megalopolis consists of the group of metropolitan areas in North America largely in the Great Lakes region. It extends from the Midwestern United States in the south and west to western Pennsylvania and Western New York in the east and northward through Southern Ontario into southwestern Quebec in Canada. It is the most populated and largest megalopolis in North America.

At its most inclusive, in the United States the region cuts a wide swath from the twin cities of Minneapolis–Saint Paul in Minnesota in the west, south to St. Louis and Louisville, Kentucky, and east to Rochester, New York; in Canada, it continues northeasterly to Quebec City. This broader region had an estimated population of 59,144,461 as of 2011 and is projected to reach a population of about 65 million by 2025. Within this broad region, there is a core area of more continual urban development that includes Chicago, Milwaukee, Grand Rapids, South Bend, Detroit–Windsor, Columbus, Cleveland, Toledo, Pittsburgh, Buffalo, Rochester, Toronto, Ottawa, Montreal, and the metropolitan areas between these.

History of the concept

The region was partially outlined as an emergent megalopolis in the 1961 book Megalopolis: The Urbanized Northeastern Seaboard of the United States by French geographer Jean Gottmann. Gottmann envisaged the development of other megalopolises in the U.S.: from Boston to Washington, D.C., from Chicago to Pittsburgh, and from San Francisco to San Diego.

In 1965, futurist Herman Kahn speculated about the three megalopolises in the year 2000. In the 1960s and 1970s, urban planner and architect Constantinos Doxiadis wrote books, studies, and reports about the growth potential of the Great Lakes Megalopolis. Doxiadis envisioned Detroit (on the U.S.-Canada border across from Windsor) as the central urban area in this megalopolis, which he defined as extending "from Milwaukee and Chicago to Detroit, Pittsburgh and Buffalo and into Canada from Windsor to Montreal and Quebec".

In 2005, the Virginia Tech Metropolitan Institute's Beyond Megalopolis, an attempt to update Gottmann's work, outlined a similar "Midwest" megapolitan area as one of ten such areas in the United States (Canada is discussed tangentially). Over 200 million tons of cargo are shipped annually through the Great Lakes. The America 2050 project identified 11 Megaregions of the United States, including the Great Lakes Megalopolis. The Canadian part of the region is also referred to as the Quebec City–Windsor Corridor, and the densest part in Southern Ontario has long been known as the Golden Horseshoe.

Governments
There are multiple government jurisdictions throughout the megalopolis. In addition to the federal governments of the United States and Canada, there are multiple U.S. state and two Canadian province jurisdictions, and many county and local governments. Most of the states have joined the provinces in forming the Conference of Great Lakes and St. Lawrence Governors and Premiers to coordinate economic and environmental strategies throughout most of the region.

Economy
According to the Brookings Institution, if it stood alone as a country, the economy of the Great Lakes region, which includes most of the Great Lakes Megalopolis, would be one of the largest economic units in the world with a $4.5-trillion gross regional product, roughly equal to Japan's. The five Great Lakes contain one-fifth of the world's surface fresh water and have a combined shoreline of 10,210 miles (17,017 km). About 200 million tons of cargo are shipped through the Great Lakes each year.

The Chicago metropolitan area is by far the megalopolis's largest economy with over $770 billion in annual GDP. Tourism is important to the overall region's economy as well. The Great Lakes Cruising Coalition supports passenger ship cruises through a joint U.S-Canadian venture to Great Lakes Ports and the Saint Lawrence Seaway.

Education

The Great Lakes Megalopolis is home to many prestigious institutions of higher education. Two founding members of the Association of American Universities (AAU), the University of Chicago in Chicago, Illinois, and the University of Michigan in Ann Arbor, Michigan, are located in the region. The University of Chicago and Northwestern University in the Chicago area are two high-ranking world universities. Other major universities include the University of Toronto in Toronto, Ontario; McGill University in Montreal, Quebec; Carnegie Mellon in Pittsburgh, Pennsylvania; Case Western Reserve University in Cleveland, Ohio; and the University of Notre Dame in Notre Dame, Indiana.

The region also contains large multi-campus state university systems such as the University of Illinois System, University of Minnesota System, University of Missouri System, University of Wisconsin System, the University System of Ohio, the Indiana University System, and the Purdue University System.

Major land and marine transportation corridors

The Great Lakes Megalopolis includes the following major inter-urban corridors that are provided with freeway and passenger rail service in both the core and fringe areas of the mega-region. Major waterways for shipping and cruising are also indicated where applicable. Amtrak in the United States and Via Rail in Canada offer rail passenger service, while most Class I freight rail services also connect these points. Major rail shipping services in both Canada and the United States is provided on tracks owned by Canadian National Railway and Canadian Pacific Railway.

Chicago-Minneapolis/St. Paul
This corridor occupies the northwestern fringe of the megalopolis. It occupies northern Illinois, southern Wisconsin, and parts of eastern Minnesota. Interstate 94 and Amtrak rail run roughly parallel from Chicago to Minneapolis/St. Paul by way of Milwaukee and Madison, Wisconsin.

Chicago-St. Louis
Interstate 55, Amtrak, and the Illinois Waterway connect Chicago to St. Louis.

Chicago-Indianapolis-Cincinnati
Interstate 65 extends from the Chicago area southeast to Indianapolis, where Interstate 74 travels through to Cincinnati. Amtrak runs regular service along this same route.

Chicago-Buffalo-Rochester

Interstate 90 and Amtrak run approximately parallel through the core area of the megalopolis from Chicago to Cleveland via South Bend, Indiana, and Toledo, Ohio, then into the eastern fringe area comprising Buffalo and Rochester, New York. Amtrak also has a passenger rail link from Cleveland to Pittsburgh which is roughly paralleled by Interstate 76. The main water route deviates well to the north of the land route from Chicago to Detroit. It runs north along Lake Michigan, east through the Straits of Mackinac, then south along Lake Huron, the St. Clair River, and Lake St Clair to the Detroit River. From this point, the water route roughly parallels the land route to Rochester by way of Lake Erie, the Welland Canal, and Lake Ontario.

Detroit-Chicago
Interstate 94 takes a more northerly route than I-90 through the megalopolis core area east of Chicago. It extends from that city to the west end of the Windsor-Quebec City Corridor by way of Kalamazoo, Ann Arbor, Detroit, and Port Huron, Michigan/Sarnia, Ontario. This interstate freeway is also paralleled by Amtrak rail service. The main water route is the same as for the western part of the Chicago-Rochester water corridor from Lake Michigan to the Detroit River. Amtrak also serves this route with the Wolverine service, between Chicago and Pontiac via Ann Arbor and Detroit.

Windsor-Quebec City
The Windsor-Quebec City Corridor lies along the northeastern fringe of the Great Lakes megalopolis. The entire Canadian section of the broader megaregion is sometimes considered a separate megalopolis. Key freeways include Highway 401 and Highway 417 in Ontario which connect with Autoroute 20 and Autoroute 40 respectively in Quebec. Highway 416 and Autoroute 50 link the National Capital Region with Highway 401 and the Montreal area respectively, but the two freeways do not link directly with each other across the Ontario-Quebec border. Passenger rail service is provided in both provinces by the Via Rail Corridor Service. Intermediate points along the corridor include London, Kitchener, Hamilton, St. Catharines, Toronto, Kingston, Ottawa, and Montreal. The main water shipping route is the same as for the eastern part of the Chicago-Rochester corridor, starting at the Detroit River but continuing east beyond Lake Ontario along the St. Lawrence Seaway to Quebec City and the Gulf of St. Lawrence.

Secondary land or marine transportation corridors

Several corridors have interstate highways but no comprehensive passenger rail service. These highway routes pass through both core and fringe areas of the Great Lakes megalopolis. The upper Great lakes region has a marine corridor that connects Lakes Superior, Huron, and Michigan. However, this route does not include parallel Amtrak passenger rail or interstate highway service.

Kansas City-Pittsburgh
Interstate 70 follows the southern fringe of the megaregion. It runs from Kansas City to just south of Pittsburgh by way of St. Louis, Indianapolis, Dayton, Ohio, and Columbus, Ohio.

Detroit-Grand Rapids
Interstate 96 serves traffic between the Detroit and Grand Rapids metro areas. The route passes through Lansing on the way and extends to Muskegon to the northwest of Grand Rapids

Evansville-Indianapolis-Port Huron
Interstate 69 extends from Evansville to Martinsville, Indiana. From there, the route is temporarily an arterial highway, Indiana State Road 37, to the Interstate 465 ring road around Indianapolis. From there, I-69 resumes and continues to the west end of the Windsor-Quebec City Corridor, crossing the border into Canada and becoming Ontario Highway 402, which eventually leads to Highway 401. Intermediate points include Fort Wayne, Indiana, and Lansing, Flint, and Port Huron, Michigan/Sarnia, Ontario.

Cincinnati-Saginaw
Interstate 75 runs from Saginaw, Michigan, to Cincinnati by way of Detroit, and Toledo, Lima, and Dayton, Ohio.

Duluth-Lake Huron
The waterway connecting Duluth, Minnesota, and western Lake Superior to points east and south includes the Soo Locks connecting to Lake Huron, then south to Port Huron MI/Sarnia ON or through the Straits of Mackinac to the metropolitan areas around Lake Michigan.

Selected American and Canadian population centers

See also

Megalopolis (city type)
Conference of Great Lakes and St. Lawrence Governors and Premiers
Megaregions of the United States
Great Lakes
Quebec City – Windsor Corridor
Conurbation
Combined Statistical Area
Census Metropolitan Area
Rust Belt

Notes
A. ^  Various sources include Quebec City, Montreal and Ottawa in the Great Lakes Megalopolis, while excluding Minneapolis–Saint Paul, Kansas City, Cincinnati, Indianapolis, Louisville, and Columbus. All these partial-consensus and non-consensus cities lie at the eastern, western, and southern fringes of the megalopolis.

Gallery

References

Megapolitan areas of the United States
Metropolitan areas of Canada
Midwestern United States
Great Lakes region (U.S.)
Geographic regions of Ontario
Chicago metropolitan area
Regions of Illinois
Regions of Ohio